The 2022–23 Midland Football League season will be the ninth in the history of the Midland Football League, a football competition in England. The Midland League operates two divisions in the English football league system, the Premier Division at Step 5, and Division One at Step 6, and these two divisions are covered by this article.

The allocations for Steps 3 to 6 for this season were announced by The Football Association on 12 May 2022, and were subject to appeals.

Premier Division
This division comprises 20 teams, one more than the previous season.

The following 3 clubs left the division before the season:
 Boldmere St Michaels - promoted to Northern Premier League Division One Midlands
 Hanley Town - promoted to Northern Premier League Division One West
 Haughmond - relegated to Division One

The following 4 clubs joined the division:
 Atherstone Town - promoted from Division One
 Darlaston Town (1874) - promoted from Division One
 Market Drayton Town - relegated from Northern Premier League Division One West
 Studley - promoted from Hellenic League Division One

Premier Division table

Results table

Stadia and locations

Division One
This division will comprise 22 teams, three more than the previous season.

The following three clubs left the division before the season:
 Atherstone Town - promoted to Premier Division
 Darlaston Town (1874) - promoted to Premier Division
 Dudley Sports - relegated to West Midlands (Regional) League Division One

The following five clubs joined the division:
 Coton Green - promoted from Division Two
 Droitwich Spa - promoted from West Midlands (Regional) League Division One

 Haughmond - relegated from Premier Division
 Hinckley - transferred from United Counties League Division One
 Ingles - transferred from United Counties League Division One

 Smethwick Khalsa Football Federation were renamed back to Smethwick Rangers before the season began.
 Graham Street Prims - were to be transferred from United Counties League Division One, but requested relegation to the Central Midlands Football League.

Division One table

Stadia and locations

References

External links
 Midland Football League

2022-23
9